"The Seven" is the 123rd episode of the NBC sitcom Seinfeld. This was the 13th episode for the seventh season, originally airing on February 1, 1996. In this episode, Elaine and Kramer turn to Newman to resolve a dispute over which of them is rightful owner of a bike, George wants to name his first child Seven, and Jerry dates a woman who seemingly never changes her clothes.

Plot
Elaine strains her neck trying to get a bike down from the wall in an antiques store. Jerry had been oblivious to Elaine's struggles, as he was working on getting the phone number of a woman, Christie. Elaine impulsively vows to give the bike to whoever fixes her neck. Kramer claims to be skilled in shiatsu technique and relieves her aching neck. He then demands the bike despite it being a girl's model. Elaine reluctantly gives it to him, but the next day, her neck pain returns worse than ever, so she demands the bike back. Kramer refuses. They appeal to Newman as a neutral third party to resolve the dispute. He declares that they should cut the bike in half, so Elaine and Kramer can both have it. Elaine scoffs at the proposal, whereas Kramer tells Newman to give the bike to Elaine, saying he would rather it belong to her than be destroyed. Newman gives the bike to Kramer, stating that the bike's true owner wouldn't want it destroyed.

Kramer starts keeping a record of what he takes from Jerry's fridge, asking Jerry to bill him. At the end of the week, the bill is more than he can pay, so he sells the bike to Newman. Finding Newman riding the bike on the street, Elaine tries to reclaim the bike by grabbing his scarf as he rides away.

George tells Susan that he wants to name his future firstborn child Seven (after Mickey Mantle's jersey number) but Susan finds the name ridiculous. When Susan tells her expectant cousin Carrie and her husband Ken about the argument, they love the name and decide to give it to their child. Feeling that the name will lose its appeal if it is not unique, George follows them to the hospital as Carrie is going into labor, to no avail trying to get them to switch to a different name.

Jerry is mystified that Christie is wearing the same dress every day he sees her. When he wrangles a visit to her apartment, he sees a 1992 photo of her wearing the same outfit. Consumed with curiosity, he starts rummaging through her closet looking for other outfits. She catches him and insists that he leave. The next day she breaks up with him over the phone, denying his pleas for an in-person breakup.

Production
The man in the photo with Christie is episode co-writer Alec Berg.

The ending of the episode's George story was abbreviated during editing. Among the cuts were George telling the hospital staff that he is the father of Carrie's child so that he can fill out the paperwork which identifies the child's name, and a scene in which Jerry and Susan admire the infant Seven while George continues to brood.

References

External links
 

1996 American television episodes
Seinfeld (season 7) episodes